Oak Hill High School (previously known as Collins High School) is a high school located in Oak Hill, West Virginia.  Its mascot is the Red Devil.

On September 6, 2016, a special state committee voted to split the student body of Valley High School between Riverside High School and Oak Hill, and to close Fayetteville High School and send that student body to Oak Hill.

References

External links
 

Public high schools in West Virginia
Schools in Fayette County, West Virginia
School buildings on the National Register of Historic Places in West Virginia
National Register of Historic Places in Fayette County, West Virginia
Oak Hill, West Virginia